The 2005 FIFA Confederations Cup football tournament was the seventh FIFA Confederations Cup. It was held in Germany between 15 June and 29 June 2005, as a prelude to the 2006 FIFA World Cup. The tournament was won by 2002 FIFA World Cup winners Brazil, who defeated Argentina 4–1 in the final at the Waldstadion in Frankfurt. The final was a rematch of the Copa América final also won by Brazil. It was Brazil's second win at the Confederations Cup.

Qualified teams

Venues

Originally, Kaiserslautern's Fritz-Walter-Stadion was also intended as a venue. However, on 27 May 2004, city authorities withdrew from the bidding process, citing added costs to complete the stadium on time as the reason for the withdrawal.

All five venues were reused for the 2006 FIFA World Cup.

Match ball
The official match ball for the 2005 FIFA Confederations Cup was the Adidas Pelias 2.

Match officials

Squads

Group stage

Group A

Group B

Knockout stage

Semi-finals

Third place play-off

Final

Awards

Statistics

Goalscorers
Adriano received the Golden Shoe award for scoring five goals. In total, 56 goals were scored by 29 players, with none credited as own goals.

5 goals
 Adriano

4 goals

 Luciano Figueroa
 John Aloisi
 Michael Ballack

3 goals

 Juan Román Riquelme
 Ronaldinho
 Lukas Podolski
 Jared Borgetti

2 goals

 Robinho
 Kevin Kurányi
 Bastian Schweinsteiger
 Masashi Oguro
 Francisco Fonseca
 Francileudo Santos

1 goal

 Pablo Aimar
 Esteban Cambiasso
 Javier Saviola
 Josip Skoko
 Kaká
 Juninho
 Gerald Asamoah
 Mike Hanke
 Robert Huth
 Per Mertesacker
 Shunsuke Nakamura
 Atsushi Yanagisawa
 Carlos Salcido
 Sinha
 Haykel Guemamdia

Tournament ranking

Notes

References

External links

FIFA Confederations Cup Germany 2005, FIFA.com
 (archived)
FIFA Technical Report

 
2005
2005
2004–05 in German football
June 2005 sports events in Europe
2005 in association football